St. Mary's Bethany Convent High School is a school located in the Indian city of Hyderabad. It currently teaches students from preschool up until tenth grade

See also
Education in India
List of schools in India
List of institutions of higher education in Telangana

References

External links 

Primary schools in India
High schools and secondary schools in Hyderabad, India
Educational institutions in India with year of establishment missing